Stuart Anthony Verity (born 11 November 1948) is an English former first-class cricketer.

Verity was born at Bradford in November 1948. He later studied at Corpus Christi College, Oxford where he played first-class cricket for Oxford University. He made four appearances for Oxford, playing two matches each 1969 and 1970 against county opposition. He scored a total of 55 runs in his four matches, with a high score of 15. With his right-arm medium pace bowling, he took 4 wickets with best figures of 3 for 42.

References

External links

1948 births
Living people
Cricketers from Bradford
Alumni of Corpus Christi College, Oxford
English cricketers
Oxford University cricketers